John Kenneth Wetton (12 June 1949 – 31 January 2017) was an English musician, singer, and songwriter. Known for his dexterous bass playing and booming baritone voice, Wetton first gained fame in the early 1970s, when he joined King Crimson. 

Wetton was later the singer and principal songwriter of the supergroup Asia, which proved to be his biggest commercial success. The debut Asia album sold ten million copies worldwide, and was Billboard magazine's number one album of 1982. He also performed with many other progressive rock and hard rock bands, including  U.K., Family, Roxy Music, Uriah Heep and Wishbone Ash.
 
He later formed the duo Icon with his Asia band mate (and songwriting partner) Geoff Downes. From the 1990s he had a successful solo career. Wetton signed his name with his left hand but played bass right handed.

Career 
Wetton was born in Willington, Derbyshire, and grew up in Bournemouth, Dorset, where he attended Bournemouth School. His older brother Robert was a classical organist and choirmaster, and while practising organ would have John play the bass parts on a piano, since their home organ did not have a pedalboard. Wetton recalled that during these practices, "I got to like bass lines, because Bach bass lines are incredibly interesting. So I thought, this is good, I like bass lines, that's me." Though an enthusiast of classical music since childhood, he opted to go into rock and roll instead in order to avoid being compared to his brother. He played bass and sang in a number of early bands with Richard Palmer-James, including The Corvettes, The Palmer-James Group, Tetrad, and Ginger Man. A key early band was the jazzy Mogul Thrash; after live work with Renaissance, he joined Family and also did various recording sessions.

Wetton's big break came when his fellow Dorset native Robert Fripp invited him to join King Crimson in late 1972. This incarnation of the band also included violinist David Cross, former Yes drummer Bill Bruford, and percussionist Jamie Muir. His time in the band would allow Wetton to come into his own as a lead singer and writer. Wetton's old friend Richard Palmer-James also worked with the band as their primary lyricist. Wetton remained with the band until Fripp unexpectedly disbanded it in 1974. King Crimson maintained their interest in improvisation throughout this period, but moved away from the classical, jazz and English folk leanings of their earlier work. The 1972-1974 period featured a more aggressive fusion/avant-rock sound, led by Wetton's thunderous, melodic bass lines- whose "roaring and crunching" sound (enhanced with effects pedals and a rotating Leslie speaker cabinet (traditionally used with a Hammond Organ) often verged on heavy metal. Fripp once compared playing onstage with Wetton and drummer Bill Bruford to working with "a flying brick wall".

After the dissolution of King Crimson, Wetton continued to work on various projects, including a tour with Roxy Music and two albums with Uriah Heep. While still with King Crimson, Wetton had been asked by Roxy Music to "sit in" on their auditions for a replacement bass player and give his recommendations; dissatisfied with all the applicants, he offered to do the 1975 tour with the group himself so as to give them time to find a good bassist. In 1977, after failed attempts to reunite King Crimson and to create a new band with Rick Wakeman, Wetton formed U.K. with his King Crimson rhythm section partner Bill Bruford. Wetton recruited Roxy Music keyboardist/violinist Eddie Jobson, while Bruford brought in innovative guitarist Allan Holdsworth from his solo group. U.K. adopted a more composition-driven approach than King Crimson, per Wetton's preference.

After the break-up of U.K., Wetton released his first solo album, Caught in the Crossfire (1980). Later that year he had a brief stint in Wishbone Ash, appearing on their album Number the Brave (1981). In late 1981 he had a meeting with Geffen Records' boss John Kalodner who took him to task for playing bass in Bryan Ferry's backing band, feeling he should be fronting a group himself. At Kalodner's insistence, Wetton started writing with former Yes guitarist Steve Howe, with a view to forming their own band. Joined by keyboardist Geoff Downes, and drummer Carl Palmer (of Emerson, Lake & Palmer), this band would become Asia, and they produced one of the best selling albums of the 1980s. Their self-titled debut album "Asia" sold over 10 million copies worldwide, making the band a household name across the globe. John worked with Asia until 1983. In that year, Wetton was fired from Asia (at the insistence of Geffen Records) for then unknown reasons, but at least in part due to lower-than-expected sales of the Alpha (1983) album. He returned to Asia in 1985 (with Mandy Meyer replacing Steve Howe on guitar) to complete Astra (1985).

In the late 1980s, a collaboration between Wetton and Roxy Music guitarist Phil Manzanera was released as Wetton/Manzanera (1986). Around this time, Wetton began working with Geoff Downes and Carl Palmer to restart Asia. Some of the material they recorded was featured on 1990's Then & Now CD, including a radio hit in "Days Like These."

The 1990s saw Wetton mostly focusing on his solo career. In 1999, an aborted attempt to reform Asia resulted in Wetton and Carl Palmer forming a short-lived progressive group dubbed Qango with John Young and Dave Kilminster. Qango performed several shows in the UK, and recorded a live album, Live in the Hood, before disbanding.

In the early 2000s, Wetton reunited with Geoff Downes for Icon. In 2006, a reunion of the original Asia line-up (Wetton, Downes, Howe, Palmer) finally occurred. A studio album titled Phoenix (2008), the original band's first since 1983's Alpha, was released in April 2008 and peaked at No. 73 on the Billboard 200 albums chart in the United States. The original line-up released two more studio albums, Omega (2010) and XXX (2012) before Howe departed in January 2013 to focus on Yes. With new guitarist Sam Coulson, Asia released Gravitas in March of 2014.

In 2013, he guested on the album Grandine il vento with Renaissance, with whom he had played live 42 years before. That same year, he toured with American Idol finalist Leslie Hunt's Chicago-based band District 97 to commemorate the 40th anniversary of the King Crimson album Larks' Tongues In Aspic.

Wetton also worked extensively as a session musician with such musicians as Brian Eno, Bryan Ferry and Ayreon.

Death
Wetton died in his sleep from complications of colorectal cancer at the Macmillan Unit at Christchurch Hospital in Christchurch, Dorset, on 31 January 2017. He was survived by his wife Lisa, son Dylan, brother Robert and mother Margaret (Peggy).

Geoff Downes stated: 

Billy Sherwood, who was Wetton's producer, co-songwriter and co-performer on his 2011 solo album Raised in Captivity, replaced him in Asia. On June 17, 2017, Asia performed a special concert in Wetton's memory, titled An Extraordinary Life (full title: An Extraordinary Life - An Interactive Celebration of the Life & Music of John Wetton), in reference to the eponymous song from the Asia album Phoenix; Fan-submitted performances were shown on a large video screen above the stage. Some King Crimson songs were also performed at the event.

Asteroid 72802 Wetton, discovered by Marc Buie at Kitt Peak National Observatory in 2001, was named in his memory. The official  was published by the Minor Planet Center on 18 May 2019.

Influence
Artists who have cited Wetton as an influence, or have expressed their admiration for him, include Billy Sheehan, Juan Alderete of The Mars Volta and Racer X, Michael Sweet of Stryper, Ron Anderson, and Joseph D. Rowland of Pallbearer. Following Wetton's death, Eric Clapton published a short instrumental tribute entitled, "For John W."

Band timeline
 Mogul Thrash (1971)
 Gordon Haskell (1971)
 Family (1971–1972)
 Larry Norman (1972)
 King Crimson (1972–1974)
 Roxy Music (1974–1975)
 Uriah Heep (1975–1976)
 U.K. (1977–1980, 2011–2015)
 Jack-Knife (1979)
 Wishbone Ash (1980)
 John Wetton (1980–2017)
 Asia (1981–1983, 1984–1986, 1989–1991, 2006–2017)
 Qango (1999–2000)
 Icon (Wetton/Downes) (2002, 2005–2009)

Discography

Solo

Studio albums

Live albums 

 Compilations

 King's Road, 1972–1980 (1987) E'G/Virgin Records
 Anthology (2001) NMC
 ...Caught in the Crossfire... (2002) Digimode Entertainment UK. Not to be confused with Wetton's 1980 first solo album. 17 tracks from various Wetton projects including Wetton/Manzanera (1987) and Battle Lines (1994).
 The Studio Recordings Anthology (2015)

As band member 
{| class="wikitable sortable"
!Years
!Bands
!Titles
!Notes
|-
|1971
|Mogul Thrash
|Mogul Thrash
|
|-
|1971
| rowspan="2" |Family
|Fearless
|US No. 177, UK No. 14
|-
|1972
|Bandstand
|US No. 183, UK No. 15
|-
|1973
| rowspan="9" |King Crimson
|Larks' Tongues in Aspic 
|US No. 61, UK No. 20
|-
|2012
|Larks' Tongues in Aspic – 40th Anniversary edition – box set
|
|-
|1992
|The Great Deceiver
|Live, Recorded 1973–1974
|-
|1997
|The Night Watch
|Live, Recorded 23 November 1973
|-
|1974
|Starless and Bible Black
|US No. 64, UK No. 28
|-
|2014
|Starless – 40th Anniversary edition – box set
|
|-
|2013
|The Road to Red – 40th Anniversary edition – box set
|
|-
|1974
|Red
|US No. 66, UK No. 45
|-
|1975
|USA
|Live, Recorded June 1974
|-
|1975
| rowspan="2" |Uriah Heep
|Return to Fantasy
|UK No. 7, US No. 85
|-
|1976
|High and Mighty
|UK No. 56, US No. 161
|-
|1976
|Roxy Music
|Viva!
|
|-
|1978
| rowspan="4" |U.K.
|U.K.
|
|-
|1999
|Concert Classics, Vol. 4
|Live, recorded 1978
|-
|1979
|Danger Money
|
|-
|1979
|Night After Night
|Live
|-
|1979
|Jack-Knife
|I Wish You Would
|
|-
|1981
|Wishbone Ash
|Number the Brave
|
|-
|1982
| rowspan="6" |Asia
|Asia
|US No. 1, JP No. 15
|-
|1983
|Alpha
|US No. 6, JP No. 4
|-
|1985
|Astra
|US No. 67, JP No. 15
|-
|1987
|Over the Top - 'Gypsy Soul|Soundtrack
|-
|1990
|Then & Now
|US No. 114, JP No. 24, Half-studio album, half-compilations
|-
|1991
|Live in Moscow 1990
|Live
|-
|2000
|Qango
|Live in the Hood
|Live
|-
|2002
| rowspan="6" |Icon (Wetton/Downes)
|Wetton Downes (Demo Collection)/Icon Zero (2017 Reissue)
|Stallion Records/Epicon Records (2017 Reissue)
|-
|2005
|Icon
|Frontiers Records/UMe Digital (US)
|-
|2005
|Heat of the Moment '05 EP
|Frontiers Records
|-
|2006
|Icon II: Rubicon
|Frontiers Records
|-
|2006
|Icon Live: Never in a Million Years
|Frontiers Records
|-
|2006
|Icon: Acoustic TV Broadcast
|Frontiers Records (also released as DVD)
|-
|2007
| rowspan="2" |Asia
|Fantasia: Live in Tokyo
|Live
|-
|2008
|Phoenix
|US No. 73, JP No. 28
|-
|2009
| rowspan="3" |Icon (Wetton/Downes)
|Icon 3
|Frontiers Records
|-
|2009
|Icon: Urban Psalm
|Live CD&DVD, Asia Icon Ltd.
|-
|2012
|Icon: Heat of the Rising Sun
|Live, The Store for Music
|-
|2010
| rowspan="4" |Asia
|Spirit of the Night – Live in Cambridge 09
|Live
|-
|2010
|Omega
|
|-
|2012
|Resonance – The Omega Tour 2010
|Live, Recorded 2010
|-
|2014
|High Voltage – Live
|Live, Recorded 2010
|-
|2013
|U.K.
|Reunion – Live in Tokyo
|Live CD&DVD, Recorded 2011
|-
|2012
| rowspan="3" |Asia
|XXX
|US No. 134
|-
|2015
|Axis XXX Live San Francisco
|Live, Recorded 2012
|-
|2017
|Symfonia: Live in Bulgaria 2013
|Live, Recorded 2013
|-
|2015
|U.K.
|Curtain Call
|Live CD&DVD, Recorded 2013
|-
|2014
|Asia
|Gravitas
|
|-
|2016
|Icon (Wetton/Downes)
|Action Moves People United - 'The Wake Bhind'''
|Various artists
|-
|2016
|U.K.
|UK: Ultimate Collector's Edition
|
|}

 Session Work 
 With Gordon Haskell
 It Is and It Isn't (1971) Wetton plays organ, bass, keyboards, vocals, gut string guitar & vocal harmony.
 With Larry Norman
 Only Visiting This Planet (1972)
 With Malcolm and Alwyn
 Fool's Wisdom (1973)
 With Peter Banks
 Two Sides of Peter Banks (1973): plays bass on track 5 ("Knights") with album covers crediting John Whetton
 With Brian Eno
 Here Come the Warm Jets (September 1973): Wetton plays bass on track 3 ("Baby's on Fire") and track 5 ("Driving Me Backwards")
 With Pete Sinfield
 Still (1973) Also with Greg Lake, Gordon Haskell, Mel Collins, etc.
 With Bryan Ferry
 Another Time, Another Place (July 1974); UK No. 4
 Let's Stick Together (September 1976); UK No. 19, US No. 160
 In Your Mind (February 1977); UK No. 5, US No. 126, Aust No. 1
 The Bride Stripped Bare (September 1978)
 With Phil Manzanera
 Diamond Head (1975)
 K-Scope (1978)
 Round in Circles/ Talk to Me (Singles) (Limited Edition vinyl) (2020)
 With Duncan Mackay
 Score (1977)
 With Atoll
 Rock Puzzle (1979)
 With Roger Chapman
 Mail Order Magic (1980)
 Hyenas Only Laugh for Fun (1981)
 With Phenomena
 Did It All For Love (Single) (1987)
 With David Cross
 Exiles (1997)
 With Steve Hackett
 Genesis Revisited (1997): Wetton sings on tracks 1 and 5 and also plays bass on track 5.
 The Tokyo Tapes (1998)
 Genesis Revisited II (2012): Wetton sings and plays guitar and bass on track "Afterglow".
 Genesis Revisited: Live at Hammersmith (2013): Wetton sings on track "Afterglow".
 Genesis Revisited: Live at the Royal Albert Hall (2014): Wetton sings on track "Firth of Fifth".
 With Martin Orford
 Classical Music And Popular Songs (2000): lead vocals on track 2.
 The Old Road (2008): lead vocals on tracks 4 and 8, bass guitar on tracks 4 and 6.
 With Galahad
 Year Zero (2002): Joint lead vocals on "Belt Up" and "Take a Deep Breath and Hold on Tight".
 With Daniele Liverani
 Genius A Rock Opera – Episode 1 (2002)
 With Billy Sherwood
 Back Against the Wall (2005): lead vocals on "Mother" and "Hey You".
 Return to the Dark Side of the Moon (2006): lead vocals on "Us and Them".
 With Martin Turner's Wishbone Ash
 Argus Through The Looking Glass (2008) Mystic Records
 With Alan Simon
 Excalibur II: The Celtic Ring Excalibur III With Eddie Jobson
 Ultimate Zero – The Best of the U-Z Project Live (2010)
 Four Decades (2015)
 With Ayreon
 The Theory of Everything (2013) InsideOut Music - Rick Wakeman, Keith Emerson and Steve Hackett also play on this album. 
 With Renaissance
 Grandine il vento'' (2013)

References

External links

 Official site
 Official Asia Reunion Website
 John Wetton's credits on different albums at Discogs.com

1949 births
2017 deaths
English rock bass guitarists
Male bass guitarists
English baritones
English operatic baritones
English rock singers
Asia (band) members
King Crimson members
Uriah Heep (band) members
Wishbone Ash members
Family (band) members
Musicians from Bournemouth
People from Willington, Derbyshire
Deaths from cancer in England
Metal Mind Productions artists
Deaths from colorectal cancer
Progressive rock musicians
Progressive rock bass guitarists
Renaissance (band) members
U.K. (band) members
Qango (band) members
Roxy Music members
Frontiers Records artists